Al-Thawra (Arabic: الثورة The Revolution) is a Yemeni newspaper. It was founded on 29 September 1962, and celebrated its golden jubilee in 2012.

The paper was founded by the Yemen Arab Republic government entity the Saba General Organization for Press alongside Al-Jumhuryah newspaper. Al-Thawra is based in Sana'a and had a pro-government stance. After the Houthi takeover in Yemen in 2015, the Houthi's captured Al-Thawra and turned it into a pro-Houthi outlet circulated only in the north of Yemen.

See also
Al-Jumhuryah

References

1962 establishments in North Yemen
Newspapers published in Yemen
Arabic-language newspapers
Publications established in 1962
Mass media in Sanaa